The Transformation of the World Into Music is a 1994 documentary film by German filmmaker Werner Herzog. It is about the Bayreuth Festival, and focuses on the operas and music of Richard Wagner.

External links

1994 films
German documentary films
1990s German-language films
Bayreuth Festival
Documentary films about classical music and musicians
1994 documentary films
1990s German films